Saiman Miah (born 7 December 1986) is a British Bangladeshi architectural designer and graphic designer. He designed one of the two £5 commemorative coins for the 2012 London Summer Olympics.

Early life
Miah's parents immigrated from Sylhet District, Bangladesh. He grew up in inner city Birmingham and moved to Moseley at the age of 11.

Miah completed BA (Hons) in architecture in 2009 and a master's in architecture in 2012 at the Birmingham School of Architecture of Birmingham City University.

Career
In November 2011, Miah's design was chosen as the official £5 coin for the 2012 London Summer Olympics. He won £5,000 prize money as one of the winners of the Royal Mint competition for art and design students attending higher education colleges and universities across the UK to come up with a commemorative design celebrating London's role as the host city of the Summer Olympics.

In September 2014, Miah was interviewed by Nadia Ali on BBC Asian Network about his design project in Sylhet.

Awards and recognition
In April 2012, Miah received a Special Acknowledgement Award at the Channel S Awards.

Personal life
Miah lives in Birmingham, West Midlands, England. He is a Muslim and is married.

References

External links

1986 births
Living people
Academics of Birmingham City University
Alumni of Birmingham City University
Alumni of Birmingham Institute of Art and Design
English designers
English Muslims
Bangladeshi Muslims
English people of Bangladeshi descent
People from Moseley
21st-century Bengalis
20th-century Bengalis